Ferhat Kaplan (born 7 January 1989) is a Turkish professional footballer who plays as a goalkeeper for Giresunspor.

Career
Kaplan began his career at the Metaspor football school in 2000. He was transferred to Dardanelspor in 2005, where he has played since.

Kaplan is also a youth international.

On 5 August 2022, Kaplan signed with Giresunspor.

References

External links
 

1989 births
Living people
Turkish footballers
Turkey youth international footballers
Association football goalkeepers
Dardanelspor footballers
Gençlerbirliği S.K. footballers
Antalyaspor footballers
Adana Demirspor footballers
Giresunspor footballers
Süper Lig players
TFF First League players
TFF Second League players